Water cure may refer to:

 Water cure (therapy), a course of medical treatment by hydrotherapy
 Water cure (torture), a form of torture in which a person is forced to drink large quantities of water
 The Water Cure, a 1916 film starring Oliver Hardy

es:Cura de agua